On the Brink of Destruction is the first studio album by Norwegian heavy metal band Tonic Breed. It was released on November 24, 2010.

Background and recording
In May 2009, Tonic Breed won a live competition in Hvaler, Norway. The first prize was a full studio recording in Ocean of Time Studios in Fredrikstad, Norway.

The recording started July 2010 and finished two months later. Except for some guest performances in 2011, This was the last project to involve Bjørn Myhren before he left the band.

Before the recording, Tonic Breed had ten songs to be recorded. Two songs, Don't Fail Again and Oblivion, had already been recorded as demos in 2008. All songs ended up on the first album, except an unknown song from 2008 called Who I Am.

Death in Small Doses (Put to Death)

A new version of the song "Death in Small Doses" had its release a year and a half after the release of debut album. It was remixed and remastered by Beau Hill. The remake got the added title Put to Death. It has no changes from the original song in the actual songwriting. The main difference lays in the sound, but there are minor differences in the actual mix of the two songs. Death in Small Doses (Put to Death) was released on March 5, 2012.

Track listing

Personnel

Tonic Breed
 Patrik Svendsen – Lead vocals, rhythm guitar
 Rudi Golimo – Bass guitar, backing vocals
 Bjørn Myhren – Lead guitar, backing vocals
 Daniel Pettersen – Drums

Technical Personnel
 Patrik Svendsen – Producer
 Patrik Svendsen And Lasse Jensen – Mixing
 Lasse Jensen – Engineer
 Anne Marthe Strand – Cover illustration

References

External links
 Tonic Breed's official website

Tonic Breed albums
2010 albums